The Roman Catholic Diocese of Lomas de Zamora (erected 11 February 1957) is in Argentina and is a suffragan of the Archdiocese of Buenos Aires.

Bishops

Ordinaries
Filemón Castellano (1957–1963)
Alejandro Schell (1963–1972)
Desiderio Elso Collino (1972–2001)
Agustín Roberto Radrizzani, S.D.B. (2001–2007 ), appointed Archbishop of Mercedes-Luján
Jorge Ruben Lugones, S.J. (2008– )

Coadjutor bishop
Alejandro Schell (1958–1963)

Auxiliary bishops
Héctor Gabino Romero (1978–1984), appointed Bishop of Rafaela
José María Arancedo (1988–1991), appointed Bishop of Mar del Plata
Juan Carlos Maccarone (1993–1996), appointed Bishop of Chascomús
Jorge Vázquez (2013–2017), appointed Coadjutor Bishop of Morón
Carlos Alberto Novoa de Agustini, O.F.M. Cap. (2013); did not take effect
Jorge Martín Torres Carbonell (2014–2020), appointed Bishop of Gregorio de Laferrere
Jorge Ignacio García Cuerva (2017–2019), appointed Bishop of Río Gallegos
Ignacio Damián Medina (2019-)

Other priests of this diocese who became bishops
Gustavo Arturo Help, appointed Bishop of Venado Tuerto in 2000
Luis Alberto Fernández Alara, appointed Auxiliary Bishop of Buenos Aires in 2009

Territorial losses

References

Roman Catholic dioceses in Argentina
Roman Catholic Ecclesiastical Province of Buenos Aires
Christian organizations established in 1957
Roman Catholic dioceses and prelatures established in the 20th century